The M9 is a long metropolitan route in the City of Cape Town, South Africa. It connects Sir Lowry's Pass Village with Wynberg via Somerset West, Firgrove, Macassar, Khayelitsha and Nyanga.

Route 
The M9 begins at a junction with the N2 National Route just north-east of Gordon's Bay. It begins by going northwards into the Sir Lowry's Pass Village to reach the Old Sir Lowry's Pass Road, where it turns westwards. It heads west-north-west for 10 kilometres, parallel to the N2, to pass through the town centre of Somerset West and reach a junction with the R44 Route (Broadway Boulevard).

The M9 continues west-north-west as Main Road to enter Firgrove, where it turns to the south-west and immediately crosses the R102 Route (Old Main Road) and the N2 Highway again (no-longer parallel). After crossing the N2, it passes through the southern part of Macassar (separating the suburb from the Macassar Dunes Conservation Area) in a westerly direction before crossing the Eerste River. It continues west-north-west and reaches a junction with the R310 Route (Baden Powell Drive), where it enters the large township of Khayelitsha.

The M9 heads west-north-west through Khayelitsha for 10 kilometres as Govan Mbeki Drive, meeting the M32 Route, to fly over the R300 Freeway (Kuils River Freeway) and pass the Nyanga township and the northern part of the Philippi township westwards as Japhta K Masemola Road. It then crosses under the M7 Freeway (Jakes Gerwel Freeway) and passes through the southern part of Hanover Park westwards to reach a junction with the M17 Route. It enters Cape Town proper through the Wetton suburb and then passes under the M5 Freeway. After the M5, it passes through the southern part of the Kenilworth suburb to reach its ends at a four-way-junction with the M4 Main Road in the suburb of Wynberg.

References 

Roads in Cape Town
Streets and roads of Cape Town
Metropolitan routes in Cape Town